Idea Bank (formerly Romanian International Bank) is a Romanian bank based in Bucharest.

Towards the end of 2013, Romanian International Bank was sold to Idea Bank, a Polish bank controlled by Getin Holding. In April 2014, its operations continued under the new Idea Bank brand. 

It was bought by Banca Transilvania in 2021.

References

External links
 Official site - Idea Bank

Banks of Romania
Companies based in Bucharest
Banks established in 1998